The Cowichan Valley Regional District is a regional district in the Canadian province of British Columbia is on the southern part of Vancouver Island, bordered by the Nanaimo and Alberni-Clayoquot Regional Districts to the north and northwest, and by the Capital Regional District to the south and east.  As of the 2021 Census, the Regional District had a population of 89,013.  The regional district offices are in Duncan.

Geography
The Cowichan Valley Regional District covers an area between the Stuart Channel and Saanich Inlet on the east coast of Vancouver Island and the southern part of the West Coast Trail, with Cowichan Lake and Cowichan Valley proper located in its central region.  It includes the Gulf Islands of Thetis, Kuper and Valdes. The total land area is 3,473.12 km² (1,340.98 sq mi).

Communities

Incorporated communities
City of Duncan - Pop 5,047
Town of Ladysmith - Pop 8,990
Town of Lake Cowichan - Pop 3,325
District Municipality of North Cowichan - Pop 31,990

Indigenous Reserves
Chemainus 13
Claoose 4
Cowichan 1
Cowichan 9
Cowichan Lake
Est-Patrolas 4
Halalt 2
Kil-pah-las 3
Kuper Island 7
Lyacksun 3
Malachan 11
Malahat 11
Oyster Bay 12
Portier Pass 5
Shingle Point 4
Squaw-hay-one 11
Theik 2
Tsussie 6
Wyah 3

Electoral areas

A
Malahat
Mill Bay

B
Shawnigan Lake

C
Arbutus Ridge
Cobble Hill
Cherry Point

D
Cowichan Bay

E
Cowichan Station
Eagle Heights
Glenora
Koksilah
Sahtlam

F
Honeymoon Bay
Mesachie Lake
Skutz Falls

G
Saltair

H
Diamond
North Oyster
Yellow Point

I
Meade Creek
Youbou

Demographics 

Note: Totals greater than 100% due to multiple origin responses.

Notes

References

 Community Profile: Cowichan Valley Regional District, British Columbia; Statistics Canada]

External links

 
Southern Vancouver Island
Cowichan Valley
Cowichan Valley